Park City Plaza (also known as 10 Middle Street) is an office building in Bridgeport, Connecticut. The building serves as the headquarters of the Trefz Corporation and their subsidiary company, Trefz Properties. It was designed by architect Victor Bisharat and finished construction in 1973. It was the tallest in the city upon completion.

The building was renovated through 2016–2019 by Hoffmann Architects.

Design 
Park City Plaza's base consists almost entirely of a parking garage which serves tenants and the public. The tower has two thin rectangular pieces that jut out from the southern and western faces of the building, extending upwards to the roof. Floor 18, the top floor, has a greater floor area than the rest of the building as it extends outward from the rest of the building below.

The roof of the building has two digital signs on its east and western faces that display the current time and temperature at all times. The signs are mounted on the side of a mechanical penthouse.

History 
The tower was built by the F.D. Rich Company in 1973 with plans to construct a second, identical tower near the building, but the project was ultimately canceled due to financial issues.

The building was bought by Trefz Properties in the 1980s.

Renovation 

In 2016, Trefz Properties was looking to improve the appearance and energy efficiency of the building and its attached garage. The building's original facade, consisting of bronze anodized aluminum curtain wall with dark-tinted spandrel glass, some operable windows, and vertical precast panels, were exhibiting signs of deterioration. In 2006, facade recaulking and recoating of the building's precast was performed. While water infiltration was not a primary issue, leaks were reported during periods of wind-driven rain.

Trefz Properties chose Hoffmann Architects to investigate the existing curtain wall system and recommend options to renovate the facade. On-site evaluation uncovered evidence of failed window gaskets, failed or dried sealant, and faded or stained finishes at aluminum components. Hoffmann Architects presented Trefz Properties with a few schematic design options to achieve their renovation objectives and address the intermittent leak issues.

Trefz Properties chose to replace the existing windows with new blue-tinted reflective glass and replace the spandrel glass covers with new complementary colored panels. Replacement of the windows produced greater savings in energy costs going forward. To withstand the weight of the thicker insulated glazing and meet current building code for wind resistance, Hoffmann Architects recommended new exterior metal trim to be installed over the existing mullions. The renovation project also included stabilization of the soffit at the top level of the building.

See also
 List of tallest buildings in Connecticut
 Bridgeport Center

References

Office buildings in Connecticut
Office buildings completed in 1973